The 2022 Open 13 Provence was a men's tennis tournament played on indoor hard courts. It was the 30th edition of the Open 13, and part of the ATP Tour 250 series of the 2022 ATP Tour. It took place at the Palais des Sports de Marseille in Marseille, France, from 14 through 20 February 2022.

Champions

Singles 

  Andrey Rublev def.  Félix Auger-Aliassime, 7–5, 7–6(7–4)

Doubles 

  Denys Molchanov /  Andrey Rublev def.  Raven Klaasen /  Ben McLachlan, 4–6, 7–5, [10–7]

Points and prize money

Point distribution

Prize money 

*per team

Singles main-draw entrants

Seeds 

 Rankings are as of February 7, 2022.

Other entrants 
The following players received wildcards into the main draw:
  Jo-Wilfried Tsonga 
  Lucas Pouille
  Gilles Simon

The following players received entry from the qualifying draw:
  Damir Džumhur 
  Mikhail Kukushkin 
  Tomáš Macháč 
  Roman Safiullin

The following player received entry as a lucky loser:
  Zizou Bergs

Withdrawals 
 Before the tournament
  Ričardas Berankis → replaced by  Pierre-Hugues Herbert
  Ugo Humbert → replaced by  Dennis Novak
  Gianluca Mager → replaced by  Zizou Bergs
  Jannik Sinner → replaced by  Kamil Majchrzak

Doubles main-draw entrants

Seeds 

 1 Rankings are as of February 7, 2022.

Other entrants 
The following pairs received wildcards into the doubles main draw:
  Ugo Blanchet /  Timo Legout
  Lucas Pouille /  Gilles Simon

The following pair received entry as alternates:
  Hunter Reese /  Sem Verbeek

Withdrawals 
 Before the tournament
  Sander Arends /  David Pel → replaced by  Hunter Reese /  Sem Verbeek
  Hugo Gaston /  Ugo Humbert → replaced by  Hugo Gaston /  Holger Rune

References

External links 
Official website

Open 13
Open 13
2022 in French tennis
Open 13